A constitutional referendum was held in South Korea on 12 February 1975. The referendum was aimed at confirming the authenticity of the constitution, and was approved by 74.4% of voters, with a turnout of 79.8%.

Results

References

 
1975 referendums
1975 elections in South Korea
Constitutional referendums in South Korea